The LNB Pro A Best Sixth Man is an annual professional basketball award that is given by the top tier division in France, the LNB Pro A. It is awarded to the best player in a given regular season, who regularly came off the bench. The award was introduced in 2014.

Winners

References

LNB Pro A awards
European basketball awards